Scrobipalpa acuta is a moth in the family Gelechiidae. It was described by Povolný in 2001. It is found in Ukraine and the southern Ural mountains.

References

Scrobipalpa
Moths described in 2001